Marlene Graham (born May 31, 1953) is a judge and a former provincial level politician from Alberta, Canada. She served as a member of the Legislative Assembly of Alberta from 1997 until 2004.

Political career
Graham was first elected to the Legislative Assembly of Alberta in the 1997 Alberta general election as a Progressive Conservative member for Calgary-Lougheed. She served 2 terms as MLA and resigned in 2004. During her time in office she did a lot of work revising the Alberta Family Law system.

After leaving politics, she was appointed as a provincial judge.

External links

CBC News Headlines Index December 2004

1953 births
Living people
People from Red Deer, Alberta
Progressive Conservative Association of Alberta MLAs
Women MLAs in Alberta
21st-century Canadian politicians
21st-century Canadian women politicians